The 1916 United States presidential election in Tennessee was held on November 7, 1916. Tennessee voters chose twelve representatives, or electors, to the Electoral College, who voted for president and vice president.

Background
For over a century after the Civil War, Tennessee was divided according to political loyalties established in that war. Unionist regions covering almost all of East Tennessee, Kentucky Pennyroyal-allied Macon County, and the five West Tennessee Highland Rim counties of Carroll, Henderson, McNairy, Hardin and Wayne voted Republican – generally by landslide margins – as they saw the Democratic Party as the “war party” who had forced them into a war they did not wish to fight. Contrariwise, the rest of Middle and West Tennessee who had supported and driven the state’s secession was equally fiercely Democratic as it associated the Republicans with Reconstruction. After the disfranchisement of the state’s African-American population by a poll tax was largely complete in the 1890s, the Democratic Party was certain of winning statewide elections if united, although unlike the Deep South Republicans would almost always gain thirty to forty percent of the statewide vote from mountain and Highland Rim support.

In the early 1910s, the state Democratic Party was divided over the issue of prohibition. One faction, known as the “Independent Democrats,” wanted the state's Four Mile Law (which banned the sale of liquor within four miles of any school) to apply statewide, while the other faction, known as the “Regular Democrats,” wanted the state's larger cities to be exempt from this law. In 1910, the Independent Democrats fled the party and formed a coalition, known as the “Fusionists,” with Republicans, helping to elect Governor Ben W. Hooper, although the Republicans did not gain at other levels. With the divisions within the Democratic Party temporarily healed in 1914, the major state issue was the control of Memphis political boss E. H. Crump, who had been arrested and ousted from power for violating state prohibition laws.

Although Tennessee had not voted for a Republican presidential candidate since 1868, Republican nominee Charles Evans Hughes did visit the state – becoming the first Republican nominee to ever visit Nashville – during the first week of September. Democratic incumbent Woodrow Wilson did not visit the state.

Vote
No polls were taken in Tennessee until the end of October, when President Wilson was given a clear lead, which led Hughes to concede the state. Later polls early in November confirmed this view, giving Wilson a five-to-four lead over the whole state. As it turned out, Wilson won by more than the poll had suggested, and improved by six points upon the margins achieved by Alton B. Parker in 1904 and William Jennings Bryan in 1908.

Results

Results by county

References 

1916 Tennessee elections
Tennessee
1916